The women's doubles tournament at the 1971 French Open was held from 24 May to 6 June 1971 on the outdoor clay courts at the Stade Roland Garros in Paris, France. The first-seeded team of Gail Chanfreau and Françoise Dürr won the title, defeating the unseeded pair of Helen Gourlay and Kerry Harris in the final in straight sets.

Seeds

Draw

Finals

Top half

Section 1

Section 2

Bottom half

Section 3

Section 4

References

External links
 Main draw
1971 French Open – Women's draws and results at the International Tennis Federation

Women's Doubles
French Open by year – Women's doubles
1971 in women's tennis
1971 in French women's sport